The North Western Rift brush-furred rat (Lophuromys menageshae) is a species of brush-furred mouse found in Ethiopia.

References

Lophuromys
Mammals described in 2007